Acacia trinervata, the three-veined wattle, is a species of flowering plant belonging to the genus Acacia and the subgenus Phyllodineae in the legume family Fabaceae.

Description
Its branchlets are smooth and  angle towards the apices. The phyllodes are very narrowly elliptic to linear with a pointed sharp tip, and 1.5–5 cm  by 1–3 mm wide. The 2 or 3 longitudinal veins are prominent. There is an inconspicuous gland 0–3 mm above the base, and the pulvinus is less than 1 mm long.

The inflorescences are simple, occurring singly in the phyllode axils on peduncles about 10–20 mm long. The 20 to 30 bright yellow flowers are 5 to 7.5 mm in diameter. The pods show slight raising over the seeds and are  6–12 cm by 1–3 mm wide. They are papery to thinly leathery, and sometimes minutely hairy. The seeds are longitudinal with the funicle folded 3 or 4 times.

Distribution
Acacia trinervata is endemic to New South Wales, and restricted to western Sydney and the lower Blue Mountains.

Taxonomy
The species was first described in 1825 by Franz Sieber, and the specific epithet trinervata derives from the Latin for "three veined".

References

External links
Acacia trinervata images on Flickr

trinervata
Flora of New South Wales
Plants described in 1825
Taxa named by Franz Sieber